Prostanthera lithospermoides is a tall, spreading shrub with white or pale mauve flowers. It is found in New South Wales and Queensland.

Description
The blue, white or light mauve flowers  have several yellowish blotches inside the corolla, and are borne in the leaf axils on long arching branches. It is one of the few species in the genus that does not have a "mint" fragrance when the leaves are crushed.

Distribution
This species is found growing near Westmar, Glenmorgan and Yuleba in Queensland  and near Enngonia in New South Wales.

Taxonomy
Prostanthera lithospermoides was first formally described in 1868 by Ferdinand von Mueller and the description was published in Fragmenta Phytographiae Australiae.

References

lithospermoides
Flora of Queensland
Flora of New South Wales
Taxa named by Ferdinand von Mueller